Maserati MSG Racing is a Monegasque racing team that competes in the FIA Formula E World Championship. The team is controlled by an investor group led by Principal Owner and Chairman, Scott Swid, and Vice-Chairman, José M Aznar Botella, and previously competed under the Venturi Racing name from 2014-2022.

History 
After eight seasons on the Formula E grid, it was announced that Venturi Racing would be renamed to MSG Racing for the 2023 season. The team announced a Title and Powertrain Partnership with Maserati in April 2022, after the luxury automotive manufacturer announced it would join Formula E for Season 9 in January 2022.

The team uses powertrains designed and developed by Maserati and DS Automobiles parent company, Stellantis, as part of a regulation change for the 2023 season, allowing automotive brands from the same ownership group to share a powertrain.

The team is controlled and operated by MSG Racing from its headquarters in Monaco. The 2022-23 season marked the return of the Maserati brand to single-seater competition for the first time 65 years, after last competing in Formula One in 1957.

2022–23 season 
On 3 November, the team confirmed Edoardo Mortara and Maximilian Günther for the 2022–23 Formula E World Championship.
Maserati MSG Racing made its ePrix debut at the 2023 Mexico City ePrix. Mortara retired after colliding with the barriers on lap 18 and Günther ended the race in 11th place.
On 27 January 2023 in the first race of 2023 Diriyah ePrix, Edoardo Mortara starts in 20th place and climbs up to 14th position before retiring on lap 35 with car problems, while Maximilian Günther in 21st place at the start does not start in the race.
On January 28, 2023 in the second race of the Diriyah ePrix 2023, Edoardo Mortara makes a good qualifying starting in 7th position, and his teammate Maximilian Günther also enters the top 10, right in 10th place. In the race Edoardo Mortara climbs up to 5th place, but towards the end of the race the car's performance worsens, and he loses positions finishing the race in 9th place. Finally wins 2 points for the team. While Maximilian Günther started in 10th position, he dropped one position, and remained 11th for almost the whole race when on the last lap the car collapsed in performance or ran out of energy and finished the race in 19th position, overtaken on the last lap.

Racing results

Formula E

Footnotes

References

External links 
 

Italian auto racing teams
Formula E teams
Maserati in motorsport
Auto racing teams established in 2022
Monegasque auto racing teams